Bannock Pass is a high mountain pass in the Beaverhead Mountains, part of the Bitterroot Range in the Rocky Mountains.

The pass is crossed by a road (Idaho State Highway 29 and Montana Secondary Highway 324) from Leadore, Idaho to Dillon, Montana.

History 
Bannock Pass is named for the Bannock Native American people.

In 1909 and 1910 the Gilmore and Pittsburgh Railroad was constructed through the area. In order to keep the grades manageable, the railroad used a switchback on each side of the ridge and bored a tunnel under the summit somewhat east of the current highway crossing. The railroad was abandoned in 1939.

See also
 Mountain passes in Montana

References

External links

Mountain passes of Idaho
Mountain passes of Montana
Great Divide of North America
Landforms of Lemhi County, Idaho
Landforms of Beaverhead County, Montana
Borders of Idaho
Borders of Montana
Transportation in Lemhi County, Idaho
Transportation in Beaverhead County, Montana
Rail mountain passes of the United States